John Opie  (16 May 1761 – 9 April 1807) was an English historical and portrait painter. He painted many great men and women of his day, including members of the British Royal Family, and others who were notable in the artistic and literary professions.

Life and work

Opie was born in Harmony Cottage, Trevellas, between St Agnes and Perranporth in Cornwall, UK. He was the youngest of the five children of Edward Opie, a master carpenter, and his wife Mary (née Tonkin). He showed a precocious talent for drawing and mathematics, and by the age of twelve, he had mastered Euclid and opened an evening school for poor children where he taught reading, writing, and arithmetic. His father, however, did not encourage his abilities, and apprenticed him to his own trade of carpentry.

Opie's artistic abilities eventually came to the attention of local physician and satirist, Dr John Wolcot (Peter Pindar), who visited him at the sawmill where he was working in 1775. Recognising a great talent, Wolcot became Opie's mentor, buying him out of his apprenticeship and insisting that he come to live at his home in Truro. Wolcot provided invaluable encouragement, advice, tuition and practical help in the advancement of his early career, including obtaining many commissions for work.

In 1781, having gained considerable experience as a portraitist travelling around Cornwall, Opie moved to London with Wolcot. There they lived together, having entered into a formal profit-sharing agreement. Although Opie had received a considerable artistic education from Wolcot, the doctor chose to present him as a self-taught prodigy; a portrait of a boy shown at the Society of Artists the previous year, had been described in the catalogue as "an instance of Genius, not having ever seen a picture." Wolcot introduced the "Cornish wonder" to leading artists, including Sir Joshua Reynolds, who was to compare him to Caravaggio and Velazquez, and to prospective patrons. The business arrangement with Wolcot lasted for a year, after which Opie informed the doctor that he now wished to go it alone, leading to the estrangement of the two former partners.

Through the influence of a Mrs Boscawen, Wolcot managed to have Opie introduced  at the court of King George III. The king  purchased one of his pictures and commissioned him to produce a portrait of Mary Delany. He also received commissions to paint the Duke and Duchess of Gloucester, Lady Salisbury, Lady Charlotte Talbot, Lady Harcourt and other ladies of the court. Opie's residence at "Orange Court", Castle Street, Leicester Fields, was said to be "crowded with rank and fashion every day" and he was the talk of the town. In 1782 he first exhibited at the Royal Academy and in December of that year was married to Mary Bunn. The match, however, proved to be an unhappy one and they were eventually divorced in 1796 after her elopement.

Opie's work, after an initial burst of popularity, rapidly fell out of fashion. In response to this he began to work on improving his technique, while at the same time seeking to supplement his early education by the study of Latin, French and English literature, and to polish his provincial manners by mixing in cultivated and learned circles. In 1786 he exhibited his first important historical subject, the Assassination of James I, and in the following year the Murder of Rizzio, a work whose merit was recognized by his immediate election as associate of the Royal Academy, of which he became a full member in 1788. He painted five subjects for John Boydell's Shakespeare Gallery; and until his death, his practice alternated between portraiture and historical work. In May 1798 he married Amelia Alderson whom he had met at a party in Norwich, having gone to Norfolk to carry out some commissions for Thomas Coke at Holkham Hall. They lived at 8 Berners Street, where Opie had moved in 1791, and this proved a happy marriage lasing for Opie's last nine years of life.

Opie painted many notable men and women including Mary Wollstonecraft, Samuel Johnson, Francesco Bartolozzi, John Bannister, Joseph Munden, Charles James Fox, William Betty, Edmund Burke, John Crome, James Northcote, Henry Fuseli, Thomas Girtin, Robert Southey, Samuel Parr, Elizabeth Inchbald and Mary Shelley; 508 portraits in all, mostly in oil, and 252 other pictures.

Teaching and writing
In 1805, Opie was appointed a Professor at the Royal Academy and from May 1806 gave a series of four lectures which were published as a book after his death, with a memoir by his widow Amelia Opie, in 1809. His students at the Academy included Henry Thomson. Opie was also known as a writer on art by his Life of Reynolds in Wolcot's edition of Matthew Pilkington's Dictionary of Painters and his Letter on the Cultivation of the Fine Arts in England, in which he advocated the formation of a national gallery.

Death
Opie died in April 1807, aged 46, at his home in Berners Street, and was buried at St Paul's Cathedral, in the crypt next to Joshua Reynolds, as he had wished. He had no children.

Gallery

References

Further reading

An exhaustive list of Opie's exhibited works, private commissions etc. can be found in Ada Earland's book "John Opie and his circle" (1911, p. 251 ff.).

Edwards, B. B. & Bulfinch, S. G. Biography of self-taught men: with an introductory essay (Boston: J.E. Tilton and company, 1859) pp. 191–201.
Tregellas, Walter Hawken. Cornish worthies: sketches of some eminent Cornish men and families, volume 2 (London: E. Stock, 1884) pp. 243–278.
 Earland, Ada. John Opie and his circle (London : Hutchinson & co., 1911).
 Rogers, John Jope. Opie and his works'' (London: P. and D. Colnaghi and co. etc., 1878).

External links

 Profile on Royal Academy of Arts Collections
John Opie on Artcyclopedia
The Cornish wonder: John Opie R.A. (Official website of the book of the same name by Viv Hendra)

John Opie on Artnet
Portraits of: Maria Godsal; Young woman in a white dress; A young boy; A Boy with a Staff; A beggar boy (Philip Mould Fine Paintings - accessed 23 Feb 2011)

1761 births
1807 deaths
18th-century English painters
19th-century English painters
British landscape painters
Burials at St Paul's Cathedral
Painters from Cornwall
English male painters
English portrait painters
People from St Agnes, Cornwall
Royal Academicians
19th-century English male artists
18th-century English male artists